The 1991 Northwest Territories general election was held on October 15, 1991.

Election Results

The election was held in 24 constituencies with 16,068 ballots cast, a turnout of 76.25%.

Outgoing Premier Dennis Patterson ran for re-election but was replaced by Nellie Cournoyea, who served out the entire term as the territory's first female Premier.

Election summary

Candidates

* - denotes an incumbent running in a new district

References

1991 elections in Canada
Elections in the Northwest Territories
October 1991 events in Canada
1991 in the Northwest Territories